Geruf (also Romanized as Gerūf) is a village in Chubar Rural District, Haviq District, Talesh County, Gilan Province, Iran. At the 2006 census, its population was 114, in 26 families.

References 

Populated places in Talesh County